The Goodies is a British television comedy series shown in the 1970s and early 1980s, which starred Tim Brooke-Taylor, Graeme Garden and Bill Oddie. The series, which combines surreal sketches and situation comedy, was broadcast by the BBC, initially on BBC2 but soon repeated on BBC1, from 1970 until 1980. The final seven-episode series was made by LWT and shown on ITV in 1981–1982.

Since the death of Tim Brooke-Taylor from COVID-19 complications on 12 April 2020, Graeme Garden and Bill Oddie are the two surviving cast members.

Series overview

Episodes

Series 1 (1970)

Series 2 (1971–72)

Specials (1972)

Series 3 (1973)

Series 4 (1973–74)

Series 5 (1975)

Series 6 (1976)

Series 7 (1977)

Series 8 (1980)

Series 9 (1981–82)

See also
 The Goodies discography
 The Goodies videography — the Goodies on DVD and VHS

Sources
 The Complete Goodies — Robert Ross, B T Batsford, London, 2000
 The Goodies Rule OK — Robert Ross, Carlton Books Ltd, Sydney, 2006
 From Fringe to Flying Circus — Celebrating a Unique Generation of Comedy 1960–1980 — Roger Wilmut, Eyre Methuen Ltd, 1980
 The Goodies Episode Summaries — Brett Allender
 The Goodies — Fact File — Matthew K. Sharp

References

External links
 BBC page - information about Goodies episodes

Goodies episodes, List of The